Cartoonists (and their work) awarded a grant from the Xeric Foundation, allowing them to self-publish their comics. The awards are broken down by year and grant cycle (March and September). In addition, recent years' awards list the total amount awarded during the respective grant cycle. The awards were granted from 1992-2012.

Winners

1992 
 September
 Robert Eaton for King Philip's War
 Michael Kasper for "All Cotton Briefs"
 Jeff Nicholson for Lost Laughter
 Wayne Wise and Fred Wheaton for Grey Legacy

1993 
 March
 Stephen Blue for Red River
 Megan Kelso for Girlhero
 David Lasky for Boom Boom

 September
 Jon Lewis for True Swamp
 Jason Lutes for Jar of Fools
 Greg Moutafis for Killer Ape
 Adrian Tomine for Optic Nerve

1994 
 March
 Scott Getchell for Ritchie Kill'd My Toads
 Tom Hart for Hutch Owen's Working Hard
 Garret Izumi for Strip Down
Stephen Townsend for The Hood: A Change from Within

 September
 Kevin Dixon & Eric Knisley for Mickey Death
 David Tompkins & Jeff Tompkins for Health
 Bebe Williams/Art Comics Daily for Bobby Ruckers  
 Jonathan Rimorin & Yong Yi for When My Brother Was God

1995 
 March
 Kris Dresen and Jen Benka for Manya
 Scott Gilbert (comics) for It's All True
 Andy Hartzell for Bread & Circuses
 Mike Macropoulos for Super Soul Puddin' Comics
 Randy Reynaldo for The Rob Hanes Archives"

 September
 Jessica Abel for Artbabe Art Baxter for SPUD Clay Butler for Sidewalk Bubblegum David Kelly for Steven's Comics Tom Pappalardo for Alec Dear (with Matt Smith)
 David Yurkovich for Death by Chocolate 1996 
 March
 Warren Craghead for Speedy Walt Holcombe for The King of Persia Linda Medley for Castle Waiting James Sturm for The Revival September
 Thomas Galambos for from Hungary John Kerschbaum for The Wiggly Reader Steve Matuszak for Most Likely to Succeed Rafael Navarro for Sonambulo: Sleep of the Just Steven Peters for Awakening Comics Christine Shields for Blue Hole 1997 
 March 
 Ellen Forney for I Was Seven in '75 Jim Ottaviani for Two-Fisted Science Rhyan Scorpio-Rhys for Sofa Jet City Crisis Henry Wolyniec for Wahh Gene Yang for Gordon Yamamoto and the King of the Geeks September
 Fawn Gehweiler for Bomb Pop Fred Hofheinz for Paper & Binding Robert Kirby for Curbside Kevin Quigley for Big Place Comics Sarah Thornton for Lumpophilia 1998 
 March
 Aaron Augenblick for Tales from the Great Unspoken Leesa Dean for Chilltown Alejandro Fuentes for Grasa del Sol Anson Jew for Saturday Nite Jason Little for Jack's Luck Runs Out Gareth Hinds for Bearskin Jay Hosler for Clan Apis: Transitions September
 Don Bethman Jr. for Paper CinemaDawn Brown for Little Red Hot Joe Chiapetta for A Death in the Family Scott Mills for CellsOlivia Schanzer for Fragile HoneymoonDylan Williams for Reporter 1999 
 March
Shane Amaya for Roland: Days of WrathShannon Brady for Marco SoloDavid Choe for Slow JamsCarrie Golus for AlternatorRhode Montijo for Pablo's InfernoMatthew Oreto for Sky & MephistophelesJason Sandberg for Jupiter September
Nick Bertozzi for BoswashLeela Corman for Queen's DayMarcel Guldemond for Under a Slowly Spinning SunMark Price for Arm's LengthThomas Scioli for The Myth of 8-OpusJason Shiga for Double HappinessMichael Teague for epic dermis 2000 
 March
Seth Berkowitz for Best WesternRobyn Chapman for Theater of the MeekFarel Dalrymple for Pop-Gun WarRachel Masilamani for RPM ComicsWilliam Morton (cartoonist) for Cynical GirlAnders Nilsen for The Ballad of the Two-Headed BoyJohn Pham for EpoxyDaniel Way for Violent Lifestyle Vol. 1Danijel Zezelj for Air Mexico September
Santiago Cohen for The Fifth NameFriends of Lulu for Friends of Lulu: StorytimeJulian Lawrence for Drippytown Comics #2001Michael Neno for Michael Neno’s Reactionary TalesFrederick Noland for SchpilkesLeland Purvis for VOXJen Sorensen for Slowpoke: Cafe PompousGia-Bao Tran for ContentDaniel Warner for A Bright Sunny Day 2001 
 March
 Philip Bourassa for First World Ben Catmull for Paper Theater Jordan Crane for Col-Dee Brian Ralph for Climbing Out Jacob Weinstein for Dirty Boxes Kurt Wolfgang for Where Hats Go September
 Justin Hall for A Sacred Text Rachel Hartman for Amy Unbounded: Belondweg Blossoming Gerald Jablonski for Cryptic Wit Troy Little for Chiaroscuro Songgu Kwon for Blanche the Baby Killer Hans Rickheit for CHLOE Michael Slack for Land of O Dennis Tucker for Tales from Birdbun Theatre 2002 
 March
 Donna Barr for Seven Peaches: The First Seven Desert Peach Episodes Nikki Coffman and Laurenn McCubbin for XXX Live Nude Girls Toc Fetch for The Tenacious Facts of Life of a Noman, Toc Fetch Richard Hahn for Lumakick Kenjji for Witch Doctor Jai Sen for Garlands of Moonlight September
 Sam Hiti for End Times: Tiempos Finales Derek Kirk Kim for Same Difference and Other Stories Sonny Liew for Malinky Robot: Stinky Fish Blues Henrik Rehr for Tuesday Lauren Weinstein for Inside Vineyland 2003 
 March
 Jef Czekaj for Grampa and Julie Shark Hunters John Hankiewicz for Tepid Jai Nitz for Paper Museum Bishakh Som for Angel Elena Steier for The Revenge of the Vampire Bed and Breakfast Julie Yeh for Poppie's Adventures: Serpents in Paradise September
 Alex Fellows for Canvas Jay Hacker for Headstatic Jon "Bean" Hastings, editor, for Spark Generators II Neil Kleid for Ninety Candles Joel Rivers for Along the Canadian Leslie Stein for Yeah, It Is!Michael Zittel for Master Catfish 2004 
 March ($24,889)
 Mark Britt for Full Color James Campbell for Krachmacher Leland Myrick for Bright Elegy Josh Neufeld for A Few Perfect Hours Karl Stevens for Guilty Ivan Velez for The Collected Tales of the Closet, vol. I

 September ($27,765)
 Andrew Drozd for Coexisting Ryan Dunlavey and Fred Van Lente for Action Philosophers! David Heatley for Deadpan #2
 Nicholas Jeffrey for Centerfield Craig McKenney and Rick Geary for The Brontes: Infernal Angria #1 Fay Ryu for HELLO Rob Sato for Burying Sandwiches 2005 
 March ($29,270)
 Emily Benz and Summer McClinton for Thread Alex Cahill for Something So Familiar Zack Gardner for Fauna Debbie Huey for Bumper Boy Loses His Marbles Michael LaRiccia for Black Mane Jeff Lemire for Lost Dogs Jesse Moynihan for The Backwards Folding Mirror September ($28,191)
 Catherine Hannah for Winter Beard Lance Christian Hansen for Don’t Cry Melody Shickley for In the Hands of Boys Albert Benjamin Thompson for HUSK 2006 
 March ($21,406)
 Gregory Corso for And How Toc Fetch for Kids of Lower Utopia, vol. 6, no. 1 "Of Softdoor Scout Finnagain and Daffodil Dash Eleven"
 Joshua Hagler for The Boy Who Made Silence Aron Nels Steinke for Big Plans James Vining for First in Space — book was chosen for publication by Oni Press just before Vining received Xeric acceptance letter. Therefore, Vining declined the grant money, but is still considered a Xeric winner.
 Joel White for Bronzeville September ($27,598)
Emily Blair for Living Statues Alexis Frederick-Frost for La Primavera Joshua Kemble for NUMB Jason McNamara and Tony Talbert for First Moon Nate Neal for The Sanctuary Pat Palermo for Cut Flowers Mark Price for Consider Everything in Bad Shape 2007 

 March ($24,501)

 Kevin Colden for Fishtown — Colden opted to publish his book online, with the webcomics collective, ACT-I-VATE, and declined the grant money, but is still considered a Xeric winner.
 Erik Evensen for Gods of Asgard Sam Gaskin for Pizza Wizard #1
 Steve MacIsaac for Shirtlifter #2
 Tyler Page for Nothing Better Jeremy Smith for Ropeburn Ryan Alexander for Tanner - Television #1

 September ($26,548)
 
 Colleen Frakes for Tragic Relief Geoff Grogan for Look Out! Monsters! Lars Martinson for Tonoharu: Part One Corinne Mucha for My Alaskan Summer Jaime "Jimmy" Portillo for Gabriel 2008 

 May ($51,494)

 Gary Scott Beatty for Jazz: Cool Birth Marek Bennett for Breakfast at Mimi's Doughnuts Eroyn Franklin for Another Glorious Day at the Nothing Factory Jason Hoffman for Mine Jack Hsu for 8-9-3 Jenny Jaeckel for Spot 12 Dave Kiersh for Dirtbags, Mall Chicks and Motorbikes Alex Kim for Wall City stef lenk for TeaTime Justin Murphy for Cleburne Felix Tannenbaum for The Chronicles of Some Made November ($25,031)
 
 Box Brown for Love is a Peculiar Type of Thing Ed Choy Moorman for editing/compiling Ghost Comics: A Benefit Anthology for RS Eden — Featuring Kevin Cannon, Evan Palmer, Will Dinski from the Twin Cities comics scene, as well as Jeffrey Brown and Ed Choy Moorman himself. The anthology was created as a fundraiser for the RS Eden foundation for healthy Minnesota communities."RS Eden: Old Hands at New Beginnings", RSEden.org. Retrieved June 9, 2009.
 Annie Murphy for I Still Live: Biography of a Spiritualist Ethan Rilly for Pope Hats Sophia Wiedeman for The Deformitory J.T. Yost for Old Man Winter & Other Sordid Tales 2009 

 May ($22,002)

 Joe Boruchow for Stuffed Animals: A Story in Paper Cutouts Adam Bourret for I’m Crazy Timothy Godek for ! Adam Hines for Duncan the Wonder Dog Joshua Smeaton for Haunted November ($32,042)

 Sarah Becan for The Complete and Definitive Ouija Interviews Bryan G. Brown for First Fight Sixta C. for Soldiers of God Ben Costa for Shi Long Pang, The Wandering Shaolin Monk Blaise Larmee for Young Lions Lane Milburn for Death Trap Stefan Salinas for Within the Rat Nathan Schreiber for Power Out 2010 

 May ($32,761)

 Margaret Ashford-Trotter for Thunder in the Building #2 Jason Brubaker for reMIND
 Jonathon Dalton for Lords of Death and Life Wei Li for Lotus Root Children Jed McGowan for Lone Pine Ansis Purins for Zombre #2: The Magic Forest Brittney Sabo and Anna Bratton for Francis Sharp in the Grip of the Uncanny! Book 1 November ($31,158)

 Brendan Leach for The Pterodactyl Hunters (in the Guilded City) Steve LeCouilliard for Much the Miller's Son Nick Maandag for Streakers John Martz for Heaven All Day Melissa Mendes for Freddy Stories Kevin Mutch for Fantastic Life Benjamin Rivers for Snow 2011 

 May ($29,000)

 Seamus Heffernan for Freedom Bernard Edward Mireault for To Get Her Sam Spina for Fight Breena Wiederhoeft for Picket Line''

2012

 July ($74,510)

Liz Plourde and Randy Michaels for How i Made the World
Laurianne Uy for Polterguys
Max Badger for "Oak"
Arwen Donahue for "Old Man Gloom"
Marnie Galloway for "In The Sounds and Seas: Vol. 1"
Olivia Horvath for "Tiny Bangs"
Aidan Koch for "The Blonde Woman"
John Malta for "The Professor and The Paperboy"
Hazel Newlevant for "Ci Vediamo"
Shih-Mu Dino Pai for "Dear Beloved Stranger"
Benjamin Seto for "Usagi Jane and The Skullbunnies"
Darin Shuler for "Castle and Wood"
Caitlin Skaalrud for "Sea Change: A Choose-Your-Own-Way Story"
Bernard Stiegler for "The Reptile Mind"
Laura Terry for "Overboard"
Elaine M. Will for Look Straight Ahead
M. Young for "Wild Child"

References
Xeric Grants by year

Endnotes

Comics award winners
Comics-related lists
Lists of comics creators